Sleepwalker, "Somnambulist" (in Czech: Náměsíčná) is a painting from 1925 by Czech surrealist Jindřich Štyrský.

Description 
It is painted in oil on canvas and its dimensions are 60.3 x 30.8 centimeters. In 1965 the canvas was purchased by the Moravian Gallery in Brno.

Analysis 
In terms of style painting refers to the style of artificialism, developed by Shtirski in this period of his career.

References 

Czech paintings
Surrealist paintings
1925 paintings